Al Ettifaq Football Club is a professional football club in Dammam, Saudi Arabia. Al-Ettifaq was established after the merging of three clubs in the city of Dammam at the year 1944. Al Ettifaq is the first Saudi team to win an international title – the 1984 Arab Club Champions Cup. Al Ettifaq is also the first team to win the Saudi Premier League without any defeat. Al Ettifaq is also the first side from Saudi Arabia to win the GCC Champions League. Al Ettifaq have a total of 13 different titles to their name. The Club also has its own futsal section.

History
Before the establishment of Al-Ettifaq, there were three clubs in Dammam that were founded in 1941 (Al-Taawoun, Al-Sha'ab and Al-Shabab). These clubs began practicing their sporting activities and gathering the people of the region. In 1945, the presidents met in Faris Al-Hamid's house and decided to merge into one club. Al-Hamid suggested that new club would be named be Al-Ettifaq, which meant agreement in Arabic. They also agreed that the new clubs' colors would be green and white, which eventually changed into green and red afterwards.

Early years and first trophies 
Al-Ettifaq saw some success in the 1960's, winning their first major trophy in the 1965 Crown Prince Cup. The club also achieved the 1968 King Cup. The 60's were a relatively successful period in Al-Ettifaq history reaching five cup finals and winning two as aforementioned. In 1976, Khalil Al-Zayani a former player whom had played his entire career as a player for Al-Ettifaq, and won major trophies with the club as a player took over as manager. With Al-Zayani at the helm the team began a rebuild of the squad and implemented new tactics.

Golden era 
The squad was mainly rebuilt with promising academy players promoted from the youth teams. The 1982–83 Saudi Premier League began on the 16th of December 1982, and by April 1983 Al-Ettifaq had nine wins and eight draws with a match left to conclude the season. Going into the final matchday, Al-Hilal were leading the table with 1 point ahead of Al-Ettifaq. The two teams would face their city rivals in the final matchday on separate days. On 7 April 1983, Al-Ettifaq defeated Al-Nahda 2–0. This meant that Al-Hilal needed just a draw against Al-Nassr to secure the title, as they were ahead of Al-Ettifaq on goal difference as well. On 8 April 1983, Al-Nassr defeated Al-Hilal 2–1 to hand Al-Ettifaq their first league title. Al-Ettifaq ended the season without a single defeat and became the first Saudi team to ever do so. Al-Ettifaq also became the first team from Dammam to win the title. Khalil Al-Zayani also became the first Saudi Arabian manager to win the league title. The 1983 Gulf Club competition was also won in the same season making Al-Ettifaq the first Saudi team to win a non-domestic title.

Al-Zayani left the team to coach the Saudi national team in the 1984 asian cup and Olympics, Chico Formiga was brought in as a replacement. The Brazilian had picked up were Al-Zayani had left of by winning the 1984 Arab Club Champions Cup as well as the 1985 King Cup. Al-Zayani came back to coach Al-Ettifaq in 1987 for the second time, winning the 1986–87 Saudi Premier League once again in his first season back, and the 1988 Arab Club Champions Cup together with the 1988 Gulf Club Champions Cup in his second season.

Honours
Saudi Professional League (level 1): 2
Champions: 1982–83, 1986–87
Runner-up: 1987–88, 1991–92
First Division (level 2): 2
Champions: 2015–16
Runners-up: 1976–77
King Cup: 2
Champions: 1968, 1985
Runner-up: 1965, 1966, 1983, 1988
Crown Prince Cup: 1
Champions: 1965
Runner-up:  1963, 2000–01, 2007–08, 2011–12
Saudi Federation Cup: 3
Champions: 1990–91, 2002–03, 2003–04
Runner-up: 1986–87, 1994–95, 1995–96, 2004–05
Arab Club Champions Cup: 2
Champions: 1984, 1988
GCC Champions League: 3
Champions: 1983, 1988, 2006
Runner-up: 2007

Current squad
As of 23 January 2022.

Out on loan

Managerial history
Note: The table is currently being updated.

Performance in AFC competitions
 Asian Club Championship: 1 appearance
  Asian Club Championship 1989:

 Qualifying Round: Al Ettifaq qualified to the Asian Club Championship after winning the GCC Champions League, ending top of the group that consisted of Kazma (Kuwait), Al Sharjah (UAE), Fanja (Oman), and West Riffa (Bahrain).

 Semi-final (group stage): Al Ettifaq finished second in their group after losing their penultimate game against the eventual champions, Qatari side Al-Sadd (2–1) in a highly controversial game. Apart from the two clubs, the group contained April 25 SC (North Korea), Mohammedan SC (Bangladesh), and Pahang (Malaysia).

AFC Champions League: 2 appearances

AFC Champions League 2009:

 Group Stage – Round of 32: Al Ettifaq was arguably one of the best performers in the group stage after finishing top of the group with 12 points. They won 4 games, lost 2, and scored 15 goals in 6 games, recording the third best attacking stats in the continent in that round. Al Ettifaq were placed in Group D along FC Bunyodkor (led by Brazilian ace Rivaldo), Sepahan Isfahan, and Al Shabab (UAE).
 Round of 16: Al Ettifaq were knocked from the Round of 16 against Pakhtakor (UZB). After leading 1–0 at halftime, they conceded two late goals that ended their hopes in qualifying to the quarter-final.

 AFC Champions League 2012:

 The draw was held on 6 December 2011 in the Malaysian capital Kuala Lumpur.
 Al Ettifaq were placed in the second round of the qualifying stages, playing against the winner of the two Iranian sides: Esteghlal Tehran FC and Zob Ahan Isfahan FC.
 Al-Ettifaq lost the one-off game played on 18 February 2012 in Iran against Esteghlal Tehran FC and eventually went directly to the group stages of the 2012 AFC Cup.
AFC Cup: 1 appearance
AFC Cup 2012:
 After failing to qualify to the group stage of the 2012 AFC Champions League, Al-Ettifaq qualified automatically to the 2012 AFC Cup, and were drawn in Group C with Kuwait SC of Kuwait, Al Ahed of Lebanon, and VB Sports Club of the Maldives.
 Al Ettifaq started the competition as favorites and a strong candidate to win the competition, winning 5–1 in their first group game against Kuwait SC in Kuwait. The second game was frustrating to the Saudis as they drew in their own stadium 0–0 with Al Ahed. They defeated the underdogs of the group VB Sports Club by 6–3 in the Maldives and 2–0 in the reverse fixture. Al Ettifaq sealed their promotion with a 2–2 draw against Kuwait SC before finishing the group with a 3–1 victory in Lebanon against Al Ahed.
 Al Ettifaq finished off their season with a hard-fought 1–0 victory against Omani side Al-Suwaiq SC in the Round of 16 to progress to the quarter-finals of the tournament.

International competitions

Overview

Record by country

Matches

References

External links

Official Website
Official News Website

 
Ettifaq
Ettifaq
Ettifaq
Ettifaq
Football clubs in Eastern Province, Saudi Arabia